Nelson L. Adams III  (born 1 February 1953) is an American physician. He is president of the National Medical Association and founder and president of Access Health Solutions, LLC.

Biography

Early years
Adams was born in Miami, Florida where he attended Miami Jackson Senior High School and received a Silver Knight Award nomination. After graduating in 1970, he earned a B.A. in zoology from Howard University in 1974, and his M.D. from Meharry Medical College in 1978. At Meharry, he was named Student of the Year in his freshman class and served as President of the Meharry Chapter of the Student National Medical Association. 
 
Adams then went on to Emory University in Atlanta, where he completed his internship in 1979 and his residency in obstetrics and gynecology in 1982. He opened his first private practice in Mobile, Alabama in September, 1982.

Career
Adams moved his OB-GYN practice to Miami Shores, Florida in 1986. He became vice president of network development for Sheridan Healthcorp in March 1995. From December 1999 to January 2004 he served as medical director for Greater Miami OB-GYN Associates at Sheridan Healthcorp.

He founded Access Health Solutions in February 2004 and currently serves as its president and chairman. He was sworn in as the 108th president of the 112-year-old National Medical Association during their annual convention and scientific assembly in Honolulu, Hawaii on August 7, 2007.

In 2008, he launched "Walk a Mile with a Child", an annual event designed to increase awareness and emphasize community health education. The inaugural walk was held in the Overtown section of Miami on April 19, 2008. The first official walk which was held in Atlanta, Georgia on July 31, 2008, during the NMA's annual convention.

On June 24, 2008, Adams testified before the House Energy and Commerce Subcommittee on Health in support of the Health Equity and Accountability Act of 2007, which sought to reduce ethnic disparities in health care, improve "cultural competency" among medical providers, and improve medical workplace diversity.  Adams was a panelist during a National Hispanic Medical Association Congressional Lunch Briefing for members of Congress and staff to discuss strategies to lower health care costs by addressing health disparities and to spotlight reform coalitions which include health disparities in their agenda.

On July 2, 2008, he was a panelist during a conference of the 37th Annual Conference of Rainbow PUSH Coalition in Chicago, called "Closing the Health Gap: The Civil Right to Health Care", which examined the role of discrimination and other factors in explaining the health gap.

Adams is a member of the Board of Trustees of Meharry Medical College, Barry University, the Miami Art Museum, and St. John Community Development Organization. He sits on the board of directors of the Overtown Youth Center in Miami and other organizations.

Personal life
Adams is married to Effie Jones with whom he has two children. He is the grandson of Nelson Leon Adams (1877–1971), for whom the Adams Middle School established 1967 in Saraland, Alabama.

References

External links
 LOUIS - the Library Of Unified Information Sources
 AHS president's bio
 
 "AMA apologizes to black doctors for past racism", AP July 2008

American obstetricians
People from Miami
Emory University alumni
Howard University alumni
Meharry Medical College alumni
20th-century African-American scientists
21st-century African-American scientists
1953 births
Living people
21st-century African-American physicians
21st-century American physicians